May Miller (born May 1, 1994) is an Israeli female acrobatic gymnast. With partners Avia Brener and Shoval Sofer, Miller competed at the 2014 Acrobatic Gymnastics World Championships, at the 2015 European Games, and at the 2016 Acrobatic Gymnastics World Championships.

She is the daughter of Sarah Miller, the lead coach of the Israeli national team of Acrobatic Gymnastics.

As of 2018, she is the FIG Athletes Representative for Acrobatic Gymnastics.

References

1994 births
Living people
Israeli acrobatic gymnasts
Female acrobatic gymnasts